St Anthony's Fire is an original novel written by Mark Gatiss, based on the long-running British science fiction television series Doctor Who. It features the Seventh Doctor, Ace and Bernice. A prelude to the novel, also written by Gatiss, appeared in Doctor Who Magazine #217.

External links
St Anthony's Fire Prelude

1994 British novels
1994 science fiction novels
Virgin New Adventures
Novels by Mark Gatiss
Seventh Doctor novels